Michel Fiffe (born 17 May 1979 in Havana, Cuba) is a Cuban–American comic book artist and writer. He is best known for his self-published series  and the Ultimate Marvel series All-New Ultimates.

Career 
Despite its small print runs,  has garnered acclaim from sites such as Comic Book Resources and Comics Alliance.

In 2014, Fiffe began writing All-New Ultimates for Marvel. In April, the first issue of All-New Ultimates was released, and  returned with issue No. 13.

Fiffe's other work includes editing backup features in Erik Larsen's Savage Dragon, and 
launching his  Press imprint with the debut of ZEGAS.

Bibliography
Fiffe's comics work includes:

 "The Date" (art and script, in Savage Dragon No. 160, Image Comics, May 2010)  
 Zegas #0–2 (art and script, Copra Press, 2011–2013) 
  #1– (art and script, ongoing series,  Press, November 2012 – present)
 All-New Ultimates #1–12 (writer, with artist Amilcar Pinna (#1–6, 10–12) and Giannis Milonogiannis (#7–9), Marvel Comics, June 2014 – March 2015)
 "Untitled" (art, with writer Joe Casey, in Captain Victory and the Galactic Rangers #2 & #6, Dynamite Entertainment, 2014–2015) 
 "Guilty Pleasure" (art and script in Secret Wars: Secret Love #1, Marvel Comics, October 2015) 
 "Hellcloud Awaits" (writer, with artist Benjamin Marra, in Bloodshot Reborn Annual #1, Valiant Comics, March 2016)
 "Bloodstrike" #0, #23–24 (art and script, Image Comics, May–July 2018)
" City" in Superman Red & Blue #3, July 2021

Notes

References

External links 

Living people
American comics artists
1979 births
Cuban comics artists
Artists from Havana